The neighborhoods of Barranquilla are territorial divisions that make up the five locations into which the Colombian city is divided: South East, South West, North-Central Historical, Metropolitan and Riomar.

List of neighborhoods in the localities 
Riomar

Norte-Centro Histórico

Metropolitana

Sur Occidente

Sur Oriente

Barranquilla